Anthony Richard Henry Barton  (17 December 1913 – 4 April 1943) was an English Royal Air Force officer who played an important part in the Battle of Britain and in the defence of Malta during the siege by the Axis powers in the Second World War.

Barton was from Oakleigh Park in north London. In July 1940, he  transferred to the Royal Air Force, where he was commissioned as a Pilot Officer. He took part in the Battle of Britain and was awarded the Distinguished Flying Cross (DFC).

The Times wrote of Barton: "In April 1942, when he was awarded the D.F.C., he was spoken of as a keen and courageous pilot, who had fought with great distinction in the Battle of Britain, and who had destroyed five enemy aircraft before he himself was shot down and severely wounded."

In 1942, he was posted to Malta where he was awarded a bar to his DFC. He died on 4 April 1943 in Llandow, Wales while making an emergency landing.

Barton is buried at St Andrew's church, Totteridge.

References

External links 
http://www.bbm.org.uk/BartonARH.htm
http://media.wix.com/ugd/22ea41_183bd64b6d464b9aa764e9d8d4785987.pdf

Royal Air Force pilots of World War II
St Andrew's church, Totteridge
People from the London Borough of Barnet
1913 births
1943 deaths
Fleet Air Arm personnel of World War II
Graduates of Britannia Royal Naval College
Recipients of the Distinguished Flying Cross (United Kingdom)
Oakleigh Park
Military personnel from London
Royal Air Force personnel killed in World War II
Royal Navy officers of World War II
British World War II flying aces
Royal Air Force squadron leaders
Royal Air Force Volunteer Reserve personnel of World War II